Philorheithridae is a family of caddisflies in the order Trichoptera. There are about 8 genera and more than 20 described species in Philorheithridae.

Genera
These eight genera belong to the family Philorheithridae:
 Aphilorheithrus Mosely, 1936
 Austrheithrus Mosely, 1953
 Kosrheithrus Mosely, 1953
 Mystacopsyche Schmid, 1955
 Philorheithrus Hare, 1910
 Psilopsyche Ulmer, 1907
 Ramiheithrus Neboiss, 1974
 Tasmanthrus Mosely, 1936

References

Trichoptera
Trichoptera families